Pencoedtre High School, formerly called the Bryn Hafren Comprehensive School, is located in Merthyr Dyfan on the outskirts of the town of Barry near Cardiff in Wales. It was opened in 1971 (Pencoedtre High School in 2018). Bryn Hafren Comprehensive School was an 11-19 girls' comprehensive school for approximately 1,300 students. But since 2018 the school has mixed and is now a mixed-sex school, re-named to Pencoedtre High School. It shares a mixed-sex joint 6th form with Barry Comprehensive School, formerly a boys' school, now co-educational under the name 'Whitmore High School', also since 2018.

The school's catchment area is the Vale of Glamorgan, stretching from Rhoose in the west to Wenvoe in the north, and to Ely in west Cardiff, with the town of Barry in the centre.

History
When comprehensive schools were introduced to Barry in September 1966, this was delayed for girls because of the lack of buildings. Bryn Hafren Comprehensive School opened as the comprehensive school for girls in 1973.

In 1993, Barry Sixth Form, a joint sixth form with Barry Boys' Comprehensive School was created.

In 2018, the school became Pencoedtre High School and became a mixed-gender school.

Facilities

The school also houses a dedicated 6th form block and over 14 networked computer rooms.

References

External links
 Official site

Buildings and structures in Barry, Vale of Glamorgan
Secondary schools in the Vale of Glamorgan
1971 establishments in Wales
Educational institutions established in 1971
Girls' schools in Wales